(officially written as SNK HEROINES ~Tag Team Frenzy~) is a fighting game developed for PS4 by SNK and for Nintendo Switch and PC by Abstraction Games. The game was released for the Nintendo Switch and PlayStation 4 in September 2018 and was published in Japan and Asia by SNK and SEGA and in North America and Europe by NIS America. An arcade version was released the following October and the Microsoft Windows version arrived in February 2019. It is a spiritual successor to SNK Gals' Fighters and features a 2v2 tag-team gameplay system.

Gameplay

As the game's title suggests, SNK Heroines: Tag Team Frenzy is a versus fighting game where each player uses two characters per fight but the players also choose an "Attacker" that serves as the playable character as well as a "Supporter" that assist the former. In contrast to other fighting games, it is impossible to defeat the enemy with a normal move, necessitating the use of a finishing move called the "Dream Finish". A move button can protect the character, while items are included for further gameplay features.

The game offers a story with different dialogues occurring depending on the characters fighting. Each character has additional costumes; cosmetic items are available to the players if they wish to change their characters' visual appearances. There is an online mode alongside an Spectator Mode where players can see other people's fights.

Plot
The story takes place between the events of fourteenth and fifteenth King of Fighters tournaments, most of the female fighters, including few of them who aren't present in the previous tournament (such as Jeanne D'Arc and the revived Shermie) suddenly fall unconscious. Upon waking, they find themselves in a strange mansion, along some male fighters who have been changed into women. The fighters attempt to battle their way out, but are confronted by the mastermind, Kukri, who reveals he has trapped them in his castle in a pocket dimension and they must defeat him to return home.

Characters

Athena Asamiya
Jeanne D’Arc
Kukri
Kula Diamond
Leona Heidern
Love Heart
Luong
Mai Shiranui
Mian
Miss X
Mui Mui
Nakoruru
Shermie
Skullo Mania
Sylvie Paula Paula
Terry Bogard (female version)
Thief Arthur
Yuri Sakazaki
Zarina

: Female version of a character who is male in previous appearances. Miss X has his original male form playable.
: Downloadable content
: Guest character
: Non-playable boss character

Development
Following the success of SNK's The King of Fighters XIV fighting game, SNK already had plans to make a sequel, The King of Fighters XV. However, they instead decided to develop a more light-hearted game solely focused on female fighters. Producer Yasuyuki Oda stated that while initial mentions of the game made the mechanics sound more simplified than previous games, the team also worked highly in a complex system which would attract experts in the genre. The game is also one of SNK's project with Nintendo for a long time. However, the game was also being developed for Sony's PlayStation 4.

The gameplay was designed to be completely different from the one of The King of Fighters XIV due to its distinctive features. In order to promote the game outside Japan, SNK made a partnership with NIS America to gather attention in the West. The sexualization of female characters was made on purpose, although Oda stated that characters like Mai Shiranui have received this reaction in many other games. Nevertheless, the team worked in order to make member from the cast retain their original characterization despite the change of looks. Due to negative feedback from BlazBlue: Cross Tag Battle's use of downloadable content, the company intends to avoid having these types of marketing for the released game that will be released on stores. The game is similar to a previous SNK title, SNK Gals' Fighters (which co-developed with Paon DP, the current rights owner of 1994 Data East's Neo Geo sports game Windjammers), which used only female characters with the exception of the male crossdressing fighter Iori Yagami as "Miss X". The SNK staff received feedback from many fans who wanted Miss X within the game, but could not confirm whether Miss X would make an appearance; Miss X was later announced as downloadable content. SNK also stated one of the playable characters would surprise the fans. Producer Alan Costa stated the team is confident in how the game will be localized for Westerns following issues with the localization of Ys VIII: Lacrimosa of Dana. As part of the promotional collaboration with Arika and Square Enix (as well as Examu which having developed Samurai Shodown V and Samurai Shodown V Special for SNK), they allowed SNK to add Arika's fighting series character Skullomania (in his female form as Terry and counting Miss X) and Million Arthur’s character Thief Arthur, in exchange of allowing them add original male Terry as a DLC in Arika’s Fighting EX Layer and Miss X’s original male identity Iori Yagami in Square Enix’s licensed fighting game by Examu, Million Arthur: Arcana Blood respectively.

The game was released for PlayStation 4 and Nintendo Switch in mid-2018, with SNK aiming for equivalent graphics and performance across the two platforms. The limited edition for both consoles includes extra material, including an artbook, a two-CD original soundtrack, a shirt and a "Fatal Cutie" cap. An arcade version of the game was released in October 2018.

Reception

SNK Heroines: Tag Team Frenzy received a mixed critical reception upon release. Mikhail Madnani from God Is a Geek rated the game a 7/10, praising its "unique" gameplay and competent online. Miguel Moran of The Sixth Axis awarded it a score of 8/10 and likewise praised the games "wildly different" battle system that "creates a whole new style of mind-games and combat-planning". Ben MacRae from outlet Crash Landed rated the title a 3/5, praising the art and animation but criticized the "empty stage design" and "lack of unlockables". Chris DeVisser from PlayStation Universe awarded the title 4/10, critical of the "simple combat system" and lauding it a "weak entry" in the SNK fighting game history.

As of April 2019, the game has sold 300,000 units.

Notes

References

External links

Official Japanese website (SNK)
Official Chinese website (SEGA)

2018 video games
SNK games
2D fighting games
Tag team videogames
Arcade video games
NESiCAxLive games
PlayStation 4 games
PlayStation Network games
Nintendo Switch games
Windows games
Video games developed in Japan
Multiplayer and single-player video games
Crossover fighting games